Anastasia Pivovarova was the defending champion, but chose not to participate.

Mariana Duque Mariño won the title, defeating Claire Feuerstein in the final, 4–6, 6–3, 6–2.

Seeds

Main draw

Finals

Top half

Bottom half

References 
 Main draw

Open Saint-Gaudens Midi-Pyrenees - Singles